Jeremy Gift Saygbe (born 1 June 2001) is a Liberian professional footballer who plays as a right-back and center-back for Liberian First Division club LISCR FC and the Liberia national team.

Honors 
Barrack Young Controllers

 Liberian First Division: 2018
 Liberian FA Cup: 2018; runner-up: 2019

References 

2001 births
Living people
Sportspeople from Monrovia
Liberian footballers
Association football fullbacks
Association football defenders
FC Fassell players
Barrack Young Controllers FC players
LISCR FC players
Real Balompédica Linense footballers
Liberian First Division players
Primera Federación players
Liberia international footballers
Liberian expatriate footballers
Expatriate footballers in Spain
Liberian expatriate sportspeople in Spain